Team Synergy is a Russian yacht racing team that competes in match racing sailing.

Early years
Team Synergy is an internationally renowned E-sports organization. Established in 2011, Synergy is marked as one of the first gaming organizations created.

References

External links
 Official Website

Sailing teams
2004 establishments in Russia